The 2019 Indiana State Sycamores baseball team represented Indiana State University during the 2019 NCAA Division I baseball season. The Sycamores played their home games at Sycamore Stadium as a member of the Missouri Valley Conference. They were led by head coach Mitch Hannahs, in his 6th season at Indiana State.

Previous season
The 2018 Indiana State Sycamores baseball team notched a 29–22 (11–10) regular season record and finished tied for third in the MVC Conference standings. The Sycamores reached the 2018 Missouri Valley Conference baseball tournament, where they were defeated by Missouri State in the semifinals. Indiana State did not receive an at-large bid to the 2018 NCAA Division I baseball tournament.

Personnel

Coaching staff

Roster

Schedule and results

! style=";color:white;"|Regular Season (36–15)
|- valign="top" 

|- bgcolor="#bbffbb"
| February 15 || 6:00 pm ||  || at * ||  || John Sessions Stadium • Jacksonville, FL || W7–1 || Guerrero(1–0) || Santana(0–1) || – || 342 || 1–0 || – || StatsStory
|- bgcolor="#bbffbb"
| February 16 || 2:00 pm ||  || at Jacksonville* ||  || John Sessions Stadium • Jacksonville, FL || W13–7 || Liberatore(1–0) || Palmer(0–1) || – || 274 || 2–0 || – || StatsStory
|- bgcolor="#bbffbb"
| February 17 || 1:00 pm ||  || at Jacksonville* ||  || John Sessions Stadium • Jacksonville, FL || W8–3 || Buraconak(1–0) || Jones(0–1) || Ridgway(1) || 217 || 3–0 || – || StatsStory
|- bgcolor="#bbffbb"
| February 22 || 4:00 pm ||  || at * ||  || Brooks Field • Wilmington, NC || W1–0 || Polley(1–0) || Gesell(0–2) || Grauer(1) || 803 || 4–0 || – || StatsStory
|- bgcolor="#bbffbb"
| February 23 || 10:00 am ||  || * ||  || Brooks Field • Wilmington, NC || W4–1 || Liberatore(2–0) || Knight(0–1) || Ward(1) ||  || 5–0 || – || StatsStory
|- bgcolor="#bbffbb"
| February 24 || 10:00 am ||  || * ||  || Brooks Field • Wilmington, NC || W10–0 || Whitbread(1–0) || Untracht(0–1) || – ||  || 6–0 || – || StatsStory
|- bgcolor="#bbffbb"
| February 26 || 4:00 pm || ESPN+ || at * ||  || Hennon Stadium • Cullowhee, NC || W8–4 || Cross(1–0) || McColloch(1–1) || Ridgway(2) || 494 || 7–0 || – || StatsStory
|- bgcolor="#ffbbbb"
| February 27 || 4:00 pm || ESPN+ || at Western Carolina* ||  || Hennon Stadium • Cullowhee, NC || L9–10 || Therrian(1–0) || Giles(0–1) || Corn(1) || 387 || 7–1 || – || StatsStory
|-

|- bgcolor="#bbffbb"
| March 1 || 2:00 pm ||  || * ||  || Sycamore Stadium • Terre Haute, IN || W8–1 || Polley(2–0) || Vial(0–1) || – || 428 || 8–1 || – || StatsStory
|- bgcolor="#bbffbb"
| March 2 || 1:00 pm ||  || Austin Peay* ||  || Sycamore Stadium • Terre Haute, IN || W3–210 || Ward(1–0) || Martinez(0–1) || – || 387 || 9–1 || – || StatsStory
|- bgcolor="#bbffbb"
| March 8 || 6:00 pm ||  || at * ||  || Claude Smith Field • Macon, GA || W12–7 || Polley(3–0) || Gipson(2–2) || Ridgway(3) || 369 || 10–1 || – || StatsStory
|- bgcolor="#bbffbb"
| March 9 || 2:00 pm ||  || at Mercer* ||  || Claude Smith Field • Macon, GA || W7–3 || Liberatore(3–0) || Hall(2–2) || Ward(2) || 677 || 11–1 || – || StatsStory
|- bgcolor="#bbffbb"
| March 10 || 12:00 pm ||  || at Mercer* ||  || Claude Smith Field • Macon, GA || W9–4 || Whitbread(2–0) || Graveno(1–2) || Ridgway(4) || 352 || 12–1 || – || StatsStory
|- bgcolor="#bbffbb"
| March 13 || 4:00 pm || ESPN+ || Purdue* ||  || Sycamore Stadium • Terre Haute, IN || W4–3 || Cross(2–0) || Peterson(1–3) || Grauer(2) || 653 || 13–1 || – || StatsStory
|- bgcolor="#bbffbb"
| March 16 || 1:00 pm ||  || The Citadel* ||  || Sycamore Stadium • Terre Haute, IN || W5–1 || Polley(4–0) || Connolly(2–2) || – ||  || 14–1 || – || StatsStory
|- bgcolor="#bbffbb"
| March 16 || 4:30 pm ||  || The Citadel* ||  || Sycamore Stadium • Terre Haute, IN || W4–2 || Liberatore(4–0) || Merritt(2–3) || – || 789 || 15–1 || – || StatsStory
|- bgcolor="#bbffbb"
| March 17 || 1:00 pm || ESPN+ || The Citadel* ||  || Sycamore Stadium • Terre Haute, IN || W8–0 || Whitbread(3–0) || Spence(2–2) || – || 345 || 16–1 || – || StatsStory
|- bgcolor="#ffbbbb"
| March 19 || 4:00 pm || ESPN+ || Indiana* ||  || Sycamore Stadium • Terre Haute, IN || L14–15 || Scott(1–0) || Grauer(0–1) || Lloyd(3) || 1,108 || 16–2 || – || StatsStory
|- bgcolor="#bbffbb"
| March 22 || 7:00 pm ||  || * ||  || City of Palms Park • Fort Myers, FL || W3–1 || Grauer(1–1) || Brito(3–2) || – || 263 || 17–2 || – || StatsStory
|- bgcolor="#bbffbb"
| March 23 || 6:00 pm ||  || Rutgers* ||  || City of Palms Park • Fort Myers, FL || W7–5 || Giles(1–1) || Gerace(0–3) || Ward(3) || 242 || 18–2 || – || StatsStory
|- bgcolor="#bbffbb"
| March 24 || 1:00 pm ||  || Rutgers* ||  || City of Palms Park • Fort Myers, FL || W4–3 || Whitbread(4–0) || Parkinson(0–1) || Grauer(3) || 178 || 19–2 || – || StatsStory
|- bgcolor="#bbffbb"
| March 26 || 6:00 pm || ESPN+ || #23 * ||  || Sycamore Stadium • Terre Haute, IN || W3–1 || Ridgway(1–0) || Harris(1–1) || Ward(4) || 685 || 20–2 || – || StatsStory
|- bgcolor="#ffbbbb"
| March 29 || 4:00 pm || ESPN3 || at  ||  || Hammons Field • Springfield, MO || L5–611 || Sechler(2–2) || Grauer(1–2) || – || 165 || 20–3 || 0–1 || StatsStory
|- bgcolor="#ffbbbb"
| March 31 || 1:00 pm || ESPN3 || at Missouri State ||  || Hammons Field • Springfield, MO || L5–611 || Juenger(1–2) || Guerrero(1–1) || – ||  || 20–4 || 0–2 || StatsStory
|- bgcolor="#bbffbb"
| March 31 || 4:00 pm || ESPN3 || at Missouri State ||  || Hammons Field • Springfield, MO || W12–07 || Whitbread(5–0) || Cruikshank(0–1) || – || 1,003 || 21–4 || 1–2 || StatsStory
|-

|- bgcolor="#bbffbb"
| April 3 || 6:00 pm || BTN+ || at Purdue* ||  || Alexander Field • West Lafayette, IN || W4–3 || Ward(2–0) || Johnson(0–2) || Grauer(4) || 1,430 || 22–4 || – || StatsStory
|- bgcolor="#ffbbbb"
| April 5 || 6:35 pm || BTN+ || at * ||  || John H. Kobs Field • East Lansing, MI || L0–110 || Diaz(1–3) || Ward(2–1) || – || 1,654 || 22–5 || – || StatsStory
|- bgcolor="#bbffbb"
| April 6 || 4:00 pm || BTN+ || at Michigan State* ||  || John H. Kobs Field • East Lansing, MI || W2–1 || Liberatore(5–0) || Tyranski(0–6) || Grauer(5) || 1,536 || 23–5 || – || StatsStory
|- bgcolor="#ffbbbb"
| April 7 || 1:00 pm || BTN+ || at Michigan State* ||  || John H. Kobs Field • East Lansing, MI || L0–6 || Sleeman(2–1) || Whitbread(4–1) || – || 1,438 || 23–6 || – || StatsStory
|- bgcolor="#bbffbb"
| April 9 || 5:00 pm ||  || at #27 Michigan* ||  || Ray Fisher Stadium • Ann Arbor, MI || W8–710 || Ward(3–1) || Weiss(2–2) || Grauer(6) || 442 || 24–6 || – || StatsStory
|- bgcolor="#ffbbbb"
| April 10 || 5:00 pm || BTN+ || at #27 Michigan* ||  || Ray Fisher Stadium • Ann Arbor, MI || L4–66 || Weisenburger(1–0) || Klein(0–1) || – || 369 || 24–7 || – || StatsStory
|- bgcolor="#bbffbb"
| April 12 || 6:30 pm || ESPN+ ||  ||  || Sycamore Stadium • Terre Haute, IN || W13–27 || Polley(5–0) || Tieman(2–6) || – || 560 || 25–7 || 2–2 || StatsStory
|- bgcolor="#bbffbb"
| April 13 || 1:00 pm ||  || Valparaiso ||  || Sycamore Stadium • Terre Haute, IN || W8–0 || Liberatore(6–0) || Fields(2–4) || – ||  || 26–7 || 3–2 || StatsStory
|- bgcolor="#bbffbb"
| April 13 || 4:00 pm ||  || Valparaiso ||  || Sycamore Stadium • Terre Haute, IN || W11–5 || Ward(4–1) || Rhodehouse(1–1) || – || 898 || 27–7 || 4–2 || StatsStory
|- bgcolor="#ffbbbb"
| April 16 || 7:30 pm || SECN+ || at #6 Vanderbilt* ||  || Hawkins Field • Nashville, TN || L1–7 || Hickman(5–0) || Guerrero(1–2) || – || 2,810 || 27–8 || – || StatsStory
|- bgcolor="#ffbbbb"
| April 20 || 6:00 pm || ESPN+ || at  ||  || Charles H. Braun Stadium • Evansville, IN || L2–6 || Lukas(5–3) || Cross(2–1) || Parks(5) || 227 || 27–9 || 4–3 || StatsStory
|- bgcolor="#bbffbb"
| April 21 || 1:00 pm || ESPN+ || at Evansville ||  || Charles H. Braun Stadium • Evansville, IN || W8–2 || Liberatore(7–0) || Croner(5–4) || – ||  || 28–9 || 5–3 || StatsStory
|- bgcolor="#bbffbb"
| April 21 || 4:00 pm || ESPN+ || at Evansville ||  || Charles H. Braun Stadium • Evansville, IN || W6–4 || Grauer(2–2) || Parks(1–2) || – || 228 || 29–9 || 6–3 || StatsStory
|- bgcolor="#bbffbb"
| April 26 || 6:30 pm || ESPN3 ||  ||  || Sycamore Stadium • Terre Haute, IN || W6–3 || Polley(6–0) || Hiser(3–3) || – || 678 || 30–9 || 7–3 || StatsStory
|- bgcolor="#bbffbb"
| April 27 || 12:00 pm || ESPN3 || Southern Illinois ||  || Sycamore Stadium • Terre Haute, IN || W7–2 || Liberatore(8–0) || Givens(3–6) || – || 632 || 31–9 || 8–3 || StatsStory
|- bgcolor="#bbffbb"
| April 28 || 1:00 pm || ESPN3 || Southern Illinois ||  || Sycamore Stadium • Terre Haute, IN || W7–4 || Ward(5–1) || Yeager(2–2) || Grauer(7) || 567 || 32–9 || 9–3 || StatsStory
|-

|- bgcolor="#ffbbbb"
| May 1 || 7:00 pm || BTN+ || at Illinois* ||  || Illinois Field • Champaign, IL || L2–5 || Sefcik(2–1) || Klein(0–2) || Acton(15) || 613 || 32–10 || – || StatsStory
|- bgcolor="#ffbbbb"
| May 3 || 6:00 pm || ESPN+ || at Illinois State ||  || Duffy Bass Field • Normal, IL || L3–4 || Headrick(6–3) || Grauer(2–3) || – || 316 || 32–11 || 9–4 || StatsStory
|- bgcolor="#bbffbb"
| May 4 || 3:00 pm || ESPN+ || at Illinois State ||  || Duffy Bass Field • Normal, IL || W13–1 || Liberatore(9–0) || Lindgren(4–4) || – || 554 || 33–11 || 10–4 || StatsStory
|- bgcolor="#bbffbb"
| May 5 || 2:00 pm || ESPN+ || at Illinois State ||  || Duffy Bass Field • Normal, IL || W6–1 || Whitbread(6–1) || Walker(3–7) || Ward(5) || 368 || 34–11 || 11–4 || StatsStory
|- bgcolor="#ffbbbb"
| May 10 || 7:30 pm ||  || at Dallas Baptist ||  || Horner Ballpark • Dallas, TX || L2–128 || Martinson(7–3) || Polley(6–1) || – || 828 || 34–12 || 11–5 || StatsStory
|- bgcolor="#ffbbbb"
| May 11 || 9:30 pm || ESPNU || at Dallas Baptist ||  || Horner Ballpark • Dallas, TX || L1–8 || Johnson(8–2) || Liberatore(9–1) || – || 801 || 34–13 || 11–6 || StatsStory
|- bgcolor="#ffbbbb"
| May 12 || 3:00 pm ||  || at Dallas Baptist ||  || Horner Ballpark • Dallas, TX || L3–7 || Carraway(4–1) || Whitbread(6–2) || Hines(3) || 686 || 34–14 || 11–7 || StatsStory
|- bgcolor="#ffbbbb"
| May 16 || 6:30 pm || ESPN+ ||  ||  || Sycamore Stadium • Terre Haute, IN || L5–9 || Cook(5–1) || Ward(5–2) || – || 456 || 34–15 || 11–8 || StatsStory
|- bgcolor="#bbffbb"
| May 17 || 6:30 pm || ESPN+ || Bradley ||  || Sycamore Stadium • Terre Haute, IN || W12–8 || Liberatore(10–1) || Olson(1–2) || – || 428 || 35–15 || 12–8 || StatsStory
|- bgcolor="#bbffbb"
| May 18 || 2:00 pm || ESPN+ || Bradley ||  || Sycamore Stadium • Terre Haute, IN || W10–2 || Whitbread(7–2) || Lund(5–4) || – || 540 || 36–15 || 13–8 || StatsStory
|-

|-
! style=";color:white;"|Postseason (7–3)
|- valign="top" 

|- bgcolor="#bbffbb"
| May 22 || 7:30 pm || ESPN+ || (4) Evansville || (3) || Duffy Bass Field • Normal, IL || W7–0 || Polley(7–1) || Lukas(5–6) || – ||  || 37–15 || – || StatsStory
|- bgcolor="#ffbbbb"
| May 23 || 8:00 pm || ESPN+ || at (2) Illinois State || (3) || Duffy Bass Field • Normal, IL || L7–10 || Anderson(3–0) || Ward(5–3) || Gilmore(11) || 694 || 37–16 || – || StatsStory
|- bgcolor="#bbffbb"
| May 24 || 12:00 pm || ESPN+ || (8) Southern Illinois || (3) || Duffy Bass Field • Normal, IL || W4–1 || Whitbread(8–2) || Steidl(3–4) || Guerrero(1) ||  || 38–16 || – || StatsStory
|- bgcolor="#bbffbb"
| May 24 || 10:00 pm || ESPN+ || at (2) Illinois State || (3) || Duffy Bass Field • Normal, IL || W10–6 || Ward(6–3) || Wicklund(4–4) || – ||  || 39–16 || – || StatsStory
|- bgcolor="#bbffbb"
| May 25 || 3:00 pm || ESPN+ || (1) Dallas Baptist || (3) || Duffy Bass Field • Normal, IL || W9–5 || Moralis(1–0) || Reeves(1–1) || Grauer(8) ||  || 40–16 || – || StatsStory
|- bgcolor="#bbffbb"
| May 25 || 7:15 pm || ESPN+ || (1) Dallas Baptist || (3) || Duffy Bass Field • Normal, IL || W16–38 || Ridgway(2–0) || Towns(2–2) || – || 326 || 41–16 || – || StatsStory
|-

|- bgcolor="#bbffbb"
| May 31 || 1:00 pm || ESPN3 || (3) McNeese State || (2) || Hawkins Field • Nashville, TN || W6–5 || Polley(8–1) || McLemore(1–1) || Grauer(9) || 3,248 || 42–16 || – || StatsStory
|- bgcolor="#ffbbbb"
| June 1 || 7:00 pm || ESPN3 || at (1) Vanderbilt || (2) || Hawkins Field • Nashville, TN || L5–8 || Rocker(9–5) || Liberatore(10–2) || Eder(3) || 3,626 || 42–17 || – || StatsStory
|- bgcolor="#bbffbb"
| June 2 || 3:00 pm || ESPN3 || (4)  || (2) || Hawkins Field • Nashville, TN || W10–5 || Whitbread(9–2) || Smith(7–5) || Ridgway(5) || 3,289 || 43–17 || – || StatsStory
|- bgcolor="#ffbbbb"
| June 2 || 9:00 pm || ESPN3 || at (1) Vanderbilt || (2) || Hawkins Field • Nashville, TN || L1–12 || Hickman(8–0) || Guerrero(1–3) || – || 3,626 || 43–18 || – || StatsStory
|-

| style="font-size:88%" | Legend:       = Win       = Loss      Bold = Indiana State team member
|-
| style="font-size:88%" | "#" represents ranking. All rankings from Collegiate Baseball on the date of the contest."()" represents postseason seeding in the MVC Tournament or NCAA Regional, respectively.

Rankings

References

Indiana State Sycamores
Indiana State Sycamores baseball
Indiana State Sycamores baseball seasons
Indiana State